Lauri Kaukonen (March 3, 1902, Rantasalmi, Grand Duchy of Finland - January 8, 1975, Helsinki, Finland) was a Finnish Secretariate Counsellor, board member, business executive, teacher, lecturer, and author.

He was a member of the executive team and administrative executive at Valio, which is the market leader in dairy products in Finland. Valio's employee Artturi Ilmari Virtanen received a Nobel Prize in Chemistry.

Kaukonen joined Valio as an executive in 1951 and its executive team in 1956. During the same year, Valio began to export cheese, butter, and other dairy products to the Soviet Union. Valio's Viola Cheese became a highly popular product in the Soviet Union because consumers preferred western quality products. The Russian market became one of the largest export markets for Valio.  

Valio's main export market was the United Kingdom, Germany, and Italy during Kaukonen's time of service. Midnight Sun was launched in 1962 in Northern England and Scotland and became the region’s leading butter within five years. In the early 1970s a remarkable 95% of Finnish export butter was destined for the UK – but this ceased abruptly when the UK joined the EEC in 1973.  

Kaukonen was also a member of the board at The Pellervo Society, which represents Finland's cooperatives.

Kaukonen studied at the Helsinki School of Economics from where he received his master's degree in business.

Kaukonen renewed the pension scheme for dairy professionals in Finland. He also enhanced accounting, cost accounting, management and audit methods among cooperatives. He wrote a large number of articles concerning economics, business history and business computing issues for Finland's leading newspapers, magazines and congress publications. Kaukonen gave lectures at the Helsinki School of Economics and worked as a teacher at Helsinki Business College.

Kaukonen had several trustee positions in cooperatives and business societies. He was a member of the board of Meijerien Keskinäinen Vakuutusyhtiö (the insurance company for dairy professionals) and at Meijeriväen Eläkekassa (the pension fund for dairy professionals). He was also the founder and the first chairman of The Pellervo Society's Commercial Club (Pellervon liiketaloudellinen kerho).

In 1962 Kaukonen was granted Knight of the Order of the White Rose of Finland (FWR) from the President of Finland Urho Kekkonen. FWR decorations are conferred upon citizens who have distinguished themselves in the service of Finland. 

Kaukonen received the honorary title of Secretariate Counsellor (kanslianeuvos) of his achievements and dedication among Finland's cooperatives from the President of Finland Urho Kaleva Kekkonen in 1967. The title is ranked 6th in Finland's protocol rankings. The title of Secretariate Counsellor have been given for prominent professors. Staff professors are ranked 7th.

Kaukonen had five children. His son Pertti Kaukonen served as Finland's Ambassador in Kuwait, Bahrain, Qatar and The United Arab Emirates.

References

External links
 Newspaper article in Finnish
 Newspaper article in Finnish
 Newspaper article in Finnish

1902 births
1975 deaths
People from Rantasalmi
People from Mikkeli Province (Grand Duchy of Finland)